Tevita "Junior" Tatola (born 10 November 1996) is a Tonga international rugby league footballer who plays as a  for the South Sydney Rabbitohs in the NRL.

Background
Tatola was born in Auburn, New South Wales, Australia. He is of Tongan descent.

He played his junior rugby league for the Berala Bears and Holy Cross Rhinos, before being signed by the Wests Tigers.

Playing career

Early career
From 2015 to 2016, Tatola played for the Wests Tigers' NYC team, co-captaining the side in 2016. On 7 May 2016, he played for the Junior Kangaroos against the Junior Kiwis. In 2017, he graduated to the Tigers' Intrust Super Premiership NSW team. In December 2017, he signed a one-year contract with South Sydney starting in 2018.

2018
In round 1 of the 2018 NRL season, Tatola made his NRL debut for South Sydney against the New Zealand Warriors. In September, he re-signed with the South Sydney Rabbitohs on a one-year deal till the end of 2019.

2019
Tatola was part of the Souths side which started the 2019 NRL season with ten wins and three losses.  Tatola scored his first NRL try for Souths against Parramatta in their 14-26 loss at Bankwest Stadium.

Tatola played in every match of the 2019 NRL season as Souths finished third on the table and qualified for the finals.  Tatola played in the club's preliminary final defeat against the Canberra Raiders at Canberra Stadium.

2020
In round 15 of the 2020 NRL season, he scored his first try of the season as South Sydney defeated Manly-Warringah 56-16 at ANZ Stadium.

In the 2020 elimination final, he scored two tries in South Sydney's 46-20 victory over Newcastle at ANZ Stadium.

Tatola played 21 games for South Sydney throughout the year as the club reached their third straight preliminary final but once again fell short of a grand final appearance losing to Penrith 20-16.

2021
Tatola played a total of 21 games for South Sydney in the 2021 NRL season including the club's 2021 NRL Grand Final defeat against Penrith.

2022
In the first week of the finals series, Tatola was sent to the sin bin during South Sydney's upset 30-14 victory over arch-rivals the Sydney Roosters.

Tatola played 26 games for South Sydney in the 2022 NRL season including all three of the clubs finals matches as they reached the preliminary final for a fifth straight season.  Souths would lose in the preliminary final to eventual premiers Penrith 32-12.

In October, Tatola was awarded with the George Piggins medal after being voted as South Sydney's best player throughout the season.

In October he was named in the Tonga squad for the 2021 Rugby League World Cup.

References

External links

South Sydney Rabbitohs profile

1996 births
Living people
Australian rugby league players
Australian sportspeople of Tongan descent
Junior Kangaroos players
Rugby league props
Rugby league players from New South Wales
South Sydney Rabbitohs players
Tonga national rugby league team players
Wests Tigers NSW Cup players